The 1926–27 The Citadel Bulldogs basketball team represented The Citadel, The Military College of South Carolina in the 1926–27 NCAA men's basketball season. The Bulldogs were led by first year head coach Benny Blatt. They played as a member of the Southern Intercollegiate Athletic Association.

The Bulldogs claimed their first Conference tournament title, defeating  in the championship game.

Schedule

|-
|colspan=7 align=center|1927 SIAA tournament

References

The Citadel Bulldogs basketball seasons
Citadel